The smooth earth snake (Virginia valeriae) is a species of nonvenomous natricine colubrid snake native to the eastern half of the United States.

Etymology
The specific name or epithet, valeriae, is in honor of Valeria Biddle Blaney (1828–1900), who collected the first specimen in Kent County, Maryland, and was a first cousin of Spencer Fullerton Baird.

Geographic range
The smooth earth snake is found from Texas and Iowa to New Jersey and Florida.

Description
The following is a description of the scalation of V. valeriae. Rostral nearly as deep as broad, visible from above; internasals much shorter than the prefrontals; frontal longer than broad, shorter than the parietals; loreal one and a half to two and a half times as long as deep; two or three postoculars; temporals 1+2; six upper labials, third and fourth entering the eye; four lower labials in contact with the anterior chin shields, which are as long as or shorter than the posterior. Dorsal scales in 15 or 17 rows. Anal divided. Ventrals 111-135; subcaudals 24-37.

The following description of coloration of a live specimen (not in alcohol) uses Robert Ridgway's Color Standards and Color Nomenclature (1912). Dorsally Virginia valeriae is benzo brown, deep brownish drab, mars brown, or light brownish drab. The first row of dorsal scales is colored like the adjacent ventrals, which are light vinaceous-fawn, pale vinaceous-fawn, pale grayish vinaceous, or pale vinaceous-pink. The top of the head is hair brown or like the dorsum, with many dark spots on the plates. The upper labials are ecru-drab or lighter, some with drab-gray spots. There is a small black ring around the eye. The ventral surface of the head is white.

Sometimes a faint median light line is present. Also, there may be tiny black spots on the back and sides, especially in the nominate race (Virginia valeriae valeriae).

Adults are usually  in total length (including tail); record .

Habitat
The smooth earth snake is a small, fossorial species which spends most of its time buried in loose soil or leaf litter.

Diet
The smooth earth snake eats primarily earthworms and soft-bodied arthropods.

Behavior
Given its lack of sufficient defense mechanisms against larger animals, the smooth earth snake is generally not aggressive towards humans and is harmless if encountered. While it does have teeth, the size of the mouth and teeth make any strikes against humans superficial at worst. It may defecate as a defense mechanism to make itself less palatable to would-be predators. If necessary, it can be safely picked up by hand and relocated.

Subspecies
Including the nominotypical subspecies, three subspecies of Virginia valeriae are recognized as being valid. These subspecies have been considered full species.

Virginia valeriae elegans  – western earth snake, dorsal scales in 17 rows, southern Indiana through western Kentucky and Tennessee to the Gulf of Mexico, westward to eastern Kansas and central Texas.
Virginia valeriae pulchra  – mountain earth snake, dorsal scales weakly keeled, mountains of western Pennsylvania, and adjacent northeastern West Virginia and western Maryland.
Virginia valeriae valeriae  – eastern earth snake, dorsal scales in 15 rows, New Jersey to Georgia and west through northern Alabama, Tennessee, and southern Ohio.

Nota bene: A trinomial authority in parentheses indicates that the subspecies was originally described in a genus other than Virginia.

Reproduction
V. valeriae bears live young in August. Brood size is usually fewer than 10. The total length of a newborn is about 6 cm (about 2.5 in).

References

Further reading
Baird SF, Girard CF (1853). Catalogue of North American Reptiles in the Museum of the Smithsonian Institution. Part I.—Serpents. Washington, District of Columbia: Smithsonian Institution. xvi + 172 pp. ("Virginia valeriæ ", new species, p. 127).
Behler JL, King FW (1979). The Audubon Society Field Guide to North American Reptiles and Amphibians. New York: Alfred A. Knopf. 743 pp., 657 color plates. . (Virginia valeriae, p. 679 + Plate 467).
Conant R, Bridges W (1939). What Snake Is That? A Field Guide to the Snakes of the United States East of the Rocky Mountains. (With 108 drawings by Edmond Malnate). New York and London: D. Appleton-Century. Frontispiece map + viii +  163 pp. + Plates A-C, 1-32. (Virginia valeriae, pp. 112–113 + Plate 21, Figure 62).
Goin CJ, Goin OB, Zug GR (1978). Introduction to Herpetology, Third Edition. San Francisco: W.H. Freeman and Company. xi + 378 pp. . (Genus Virginia, p. 326).
Kennicott R (1859). "Notes on Coluber calligaster of Say, and a description of new species of Serpents in the collection of the North Western University of Evanston, Ill." Proc. Acad. Nat. Sci. Philadelphia 11: 98-100. (Virginia elegans, new species, p. 99).
McCoy CJ (1980). Identification Guide to Pennsylvania Snakes. (Design and illustrations by Michael Antonoplos). Pittsburgh, Pennsylvania: Carnegie Museum of Natural History. 12 pp. (Virginia valeriae, p. 4).
Morris PA (1948). Boy's Book of Snakes: How to Recognize and Understand Them. A volume of the Humanizing Science Series, edited by Jacques Cattell. New York: Ronald Press. viii + 185 pp. ("The Ground Snake", pp. 73–74, 180).
Powell R, Conant R, Collins JT (2016). Peterson Field Guide to Reptiles and Amphibians of Eastern and Central North America, Fourth Edition. Boston and New York: Houghton Mifflin Harcourt. xiv + 494 pp., 47 plates, 207 figures. . (Virginia valeriae, pp. 412-413 + Plate 44).
Richmond ND (1954). "The ground snake Haldea valeriae in Pennsylvania and West Virginia with description of new subspecies". Annals of Carnegie Museum 33 (15): 251-260. (Haldea valeriae pulchra, new subspecies).
Stejneger L, Barbour T (1917). A Check List of North American Amphibians and Reptiles. Cambridge, Massachusetts: Harvard University Press. 125 pp. (Virginia valeriae, p. 99).

External links
Smooth Earth Snake, Reptiles and Amphibians of Iowa.
Smooth Earth Snake, Savannah River Ecology Laboratory.

Natricinae
Fauna of the Eastern United States
Extant Pleistocene first appearances
Reptiles described in 1853
Taxa named by Spencer Fullerton Baird
Taxa named by Charles Frédéric Girard
Reptiles of the United States